The 2015 Big Sky Conference men's basketball tournament was held March 12–14, 2015. All games were hosted by the Montana Grizzlies, which won a tiebreaker with regular season co-champions Eastern Washington, at Dahlberg Arena. The champion, Eastern Washington, received an automatic bid to the 2015 NCAA tournament.

This was the final Big Sky tournament to be held at a campus site, and also the last one in which certain teams were excluded due to poor performance. From 2016 forward, the tournament will involve all conference members (barring NCAA sanctions), and will be held at a predetermined neutral site, with the first neutral-site tournament to be held at the Reno Events Center in Reno, Nevada.

Format
With the addition of Idaho in all sports except football, the league now has 12 men's and women's basketball programs. The 2015 tournaments expanded from seven to eight teams each, with no byes. Four quarterfinals were played on Thursday, followed by two semifinal games on Friday, and the championship game on Saturday. In addition, the top seed no longer has a bye in the tournament.

Bracket

  *Denotes overtime game

Game summaries

Eastern Washington vs. Idaho
Broadcasters: Jay Sanderson & Tanoka Beard

Sacramento State vs. Portland State
Broadcasters: Jay Sanderson & Tanoka Beard

Northern Arizona vs. Northern Colorado
Broadcasters: Jay Sanderson & Tanoka Beard

Montana vs. Weber State
Broadcasters: Jay Sanderson & Tanoka Beard

Semifinal 1
Broadcasters: Jay Sanderson & Tanoka Beard

Semifinal 2
Broadcasters: Jay Sanderson & Tanoka Beard

Championship 
Broadcasters: Roxy Bernstein & Corey Williams

References

External links
 2015 Men's Basketball Championship

Tournament
Big Sky Conference men's basketball tournament
Basketball competitions in Missoula, Montana
Big Sky Conference men's basketball tournament
Big Sky Conference men's basketball tournament
College sports tournaments in Montana